Colymbetes exaratus is a species of predaceous diving beetle in the family Dytiscidae. It is found in North America.

Subspecies
These two subspecies belong to the species Colymbetes exaratus:
 Colymbetes exaratus exaratus
 Colymbetes exaratus incognitus Zimmerman

References

Further reading

 
 

Dytiscidae
Articles created by Qbugbot
Beetles described in 1862